Rychlik  (formerly German Reichen) is a village in the administrative district of Gmina Sulęcin, within Sulęcin County, Lubusz Voivodeship, in western Poland.

References

Rychlik